Psalm 90 is the 90th psalm from the Book of Psalms and the opening psalm of Book 4 of the psalms. Uniquely among the Psalms, it is attributed to Moses. It is well known for its reference in verse 10 to human life expectancy being 70 or 80 ("threescore years and ten", or "if by reason of strength ... fourscore years", in the King James Version): it is believed that this verse was the influence for the opening words of Abraham Lincoln's Gettysburg Address. In the slightly different numbering system used in the Greek Septuagint and Latin Vulgate translations of the Bible, this psalm is Psalm 89.

Text
The psalm is originally written in the Hebrew language. It is divided into 17 verses.

Hebrew Bible version
Following is the Hebrew text of Psalm 90:

King James Version
¹Lord, thou hast been our dwelling place in all generations.
²Before the mountains were brought forth,
    or ever thou hadst formed the earth and the world,
  even from everlasting to everlasting, thou art God.
³Thou turnest man to destruction;
  and sayest, Return, ye children of men.
⁴For a thousand years in thy sight are but as yesterday when it is past,
  and as a watch in the night.
⁵Thou carriest them away as with a flood;
    they are as a sleep:
  in the morning they are like grass which groweth up.
⁶In the morning it flourisheth, and groweth up;
  in the evening it is cut down, and withereth.
⁷For we are consumed by thine anger,
  and by thy wrath are we troubled.
⁸Thou hast set our iniquities before thee,
  our secret sins in the light of thy countenance.
⁹For all our days are passed away in thy wrath:
  we spend our years as a tale that is told.
¹⁰The days of our years are threescore years and ten;
    and if by reason of strength they be fourscore years, yet is their strength labour and sorrow;
  for it is soon cut off, and we fly away.
¹¹Who knoweth the power of thine anger?
  even according to thy fear, so is thy wrath.
¹²So teach us to number our days,
  that we may apply our hearts unto wisdom.
¹³Return, O LORD, how long?
  and let it repent thee concerning thy servants.
¹⁴O satisfy us early with thy mercy;
  that we may rejoice and be glad all our days.
¹⁵Make us glad according to the days wherein thou hast afflicted us,
  and the years wherein we have seen evil.
¹⁶Let thy work appear unto thy servants, and thy glory unto their children.
¹⁷And let the beauty of the LORD our God be upon us:
    and establish thou the work of our hands upon us;
  yea, the work of our hands establish thou it.

Textual witnesses
Some early manuscripts containing the text of this chapter in Hebrew are of the Masoretic Text tradition, which includes the Aleppo Codex (10th century), and Codex Leningradensis (1008).

Authorship and date
By its header ("A Prayer of Moses, the man of God") this psalm is attributed to Moses. Theologian Albert Barnes notes "its marked unlikeness to the Psalms of David". Commentator C S Rodd suggests it was written later than Moses' era, but even from a biblical literalist perspective one writer warns against assuming with any certainty that this is the oldest psalm, because some psalms are anonymous and so "we don't know who wrote them or when".

The term also appears in Joshua 14:6 and Ezra 3:2 as a title especially appropriate to him, denoting that he was faithful to God and a man approved by God.

Uses

Judaism
Is recited during the Pesukei Dezimra during Shabbat, Yom Tov, and - in many communities - on Hoshana Rabbah.
Is recited on Shabbat Nachamu (the Shabbat after Tisha B'Av) in some traditions.
Verse 17 is recited following Motzei Shabbat Maariv and the first paragraph of the Shema during bedtime prayers.
Psalm 90 is one of the ten psalms of the Tikkun HaKlali of Rebbe Nachman of Breslov.

New Testament

Christianity
In the Divine Office of the Roman Catholic Church, Psalm 90 is appointed to be read at Lauds (Morning Prayer) on the Monday of the fourth week of the month.
In the Church of England's Book of Common Prayer, this psalm is appointed to be read on the morning of the 18th day of the month.
The hymn O God, our help in ages past is a lyrical version of Psalm 90 written by Isaac Watts.

References

Sources

External links 

 in Hebrew and English - Mechon-mamre
 King James Bible - Wikisource

090
Shacharit for Shabbat and Yom Tov
Texts attributed to Moses